Bulldogs Allstar Goodtime Band was a New Zealand novelty pop band formed by Victoria University students in 1972. They were finalists in television's New Faces show in 1973 and their song "Miss September", who were popular in the early 1970s. They are best known for their two Top 10 hits: "Miss September", and "Everyone Knows".

Album

 Bulldoggin' (1974)

Singles

 Miss September / Bulldogs (1973) [#2 NZ Chart]
 Everyone Knows / Ze Camel (1973) [#3 NZ Chart]
 Baby Get Out / Dance The Stars Away (1974)
 Television Mama / Day In The Sun (1974)

References

New Zealand rock music groups

The (Bulldog Good Time Band)
Neil Worboys
Billy Sinclair